An Alb is a liturgical vestment

ALB, Alb or alb may also refer to:

Alb, Alpine transhumance in Allemannic German

Places
Alb (Upper Rhine), a tributary of the Upper Rhine in northern Black Forest near Eggenstein-Leopoldshafen, Germany
Alb (High Rhine), a tributary of the High Rhine in southern Black Forest at the headwaters of Albbruck Menze Schwander, Germany
Crișul Alb (river), a river in western Romania
Albania (ISO 3166-1 alpha-3 country code "alb")
Albanian language (ISO 639-2 language code "alb")
Albany International Airport, by IATA code
Albany-Rensselaer (Amtrak station), a train station in Albany, New York
Albrighton railway station (National Rail code) in Shropshire, England
Franconian Jura (Fränkische Alb), an upland in Bavaria, Germany
Swabian Jura (Schwäbische Alb), a mountain range in Baden-Württemberg, Germany

Computing, science and technology
Amazon AWS's Application Load Balancer
The ALB gene, which encodes serum albumin in humans
Honda anti-lock braking system
The Asian long-horned beetle (Anoplophora glabripennis)

Other uses
ALB (musician), a French musician Clément Daquin
Alb., taxonomic author abbreviation of Johannes Baptista von Albertini (1769–1831), German botanist and mycologist
Albanian language (ISO 639-2 language code "alb")
 All-weather lifeboat (as opposed to inshore lifeboat, or ILB), such as the:
 Mersey class lifeboat, all-weather lifeboats operated by the Royal National Lifeboat Institution (RNLI)
 Severn class lifeboat, the largest all-weather lifeboat in use by the RNLI
 Tamar class lifeboat, the latest replacement of the previous Tyne class lifeboat lifeboats
Animal Liberation Brigade
, a Latvian cycling team